Fotios Zoumpos (alternate spellings: Fotis, Zoubos) (born April 4, 1993) is a Greek professional basketball player for Milon  of the Greek 3rd division. He is 6 ft 4  in (1.95 m) tall and weighs 190 lb (86 kg). He plays at both the point guard and shooting guard positions.

Professional career
Zoumpos began his professional career during the 2010–2011 campaign with the Greek Basket League powerhouse Panathinaikos and was a minor part of the EuroLeague-winning squad of that season.

During the 2020-2021 season with Apollon Patras, Zoumpos averaged 11.8 points, 3.8 rebounds and 3.1 assists, shooting with 40.8% from beyond the arc, 61.7% from the field, and 60% from the free throw line. The team achieved promotion to the Greek Basket League and Zoumpos renewed his contract with them for a fourth season on August 11, 2021. In 18 games during the 2021-22 campaign, he averaged only 2 points, 1.5 rebounds and 0.9 assists, playing around 11 minutes per game.

On July 12, 2022, Zoumpos moved to Milonas Neas Smyrnis.

National team career
Zoumpos was a member of the Greek junior national teams. He played at the 2009 FIBA Europe Under-16 Championship, the 2011 FIBA Europe Under-18 Championship, and the 2012 FIBA Europe Under-20 Championship.

Awards and accomplishments

Pro career
EuroLeague EuroLeague Champion: (2011)
Greek League Champion: (2011)
Greek Cup Winner: (2012)

References

External links
FIBA Profile
FIBA Europe Profile
Euroleague.net Profile
Eurobasket.com Profile
Draftexpress.com Profile
Greek Basket League Profile 

1993 births
Living people
Apollon Patras B.C. players
Ethnikos Piraeus B.C. players
Greek Basket League players
Greek men's basketball players
Ilysiakos B.C. players
Milon B.C. players
Panathinaikos B.C. players
Panelefsiniakos B.C. players
Peristeri B.C. players
Point guards
Shooting guards
Basketball players from Athens